The Estádio da Machava is a multi-purpose stadium in Machava, a mainly residential subdivision of the city of Matola, in the outskirts of Maputo, Mozambique. It is used for football matches and can hold 60,000 spectators.

The stadium was built by the Portuguese colonial government of Mozambique and inaugurated as Estádio Salazar, named after the Portuguese dictator António de Oliveira Salazar, on 30 June 1968 with a match between Portugal and Brazil, which the latter, formally the visitors, won 2:0.

It was in Machava that the Declaration of National Independence of Mozambique took place, on June 25th, 1975.

It is now owned by Clube Ferroviário de Maputo.

References

External links
Photos at cafe.daum.net/stade
Photo at worldstadiums.com 
StadiumDB images

Machava
Mozambique
Multi-purpose stadiums in Mozambique
Buildings and structures in Maputo Province
Sport in Maputo
Sports venues completed in 1968